Jinsha may refer to:

Mainland China (PRC)
Jinsha River (金沙江), westernmost of the major headwater streams of the Yangtze
Jinsha site (金沙), in Chengdu
Jinsha County (金沙县), Guizhou
Jin Sha Blog, a website about the Chinese luxury travel market

Towns (金沙鎮)
Jinsha, Anhui, in Jixi County, Anhui
Jinsha, Fujian, in Minqing County, Fujian
Jinsha, Jiangsu, in Tongzhou District, Nantong, Jiangsu

Taiwan (Republic of China)
Jinsha, Kinmen, in Kinmen County, Fujian

See also
Jin Sha (disambiguation)